Within the Rock is a 1996 American made-for-TV science fiction horror film directed by Gary J. Tunnicliffe. It starred Xander Berkeley, Brian Krause, and Duane Whitaker. It featured a cameo from former U.S. Marine Corps captain and technical advisor Dale Dye.

Plot
A group of astronauts, supervised by Dr. Shaw, land on the "Son of Galileo" (a large spherical asteroid about to hit the Earth), to pierce and undermine its structure in order to divert its trajectory. Thanks to a particular technology, cosmonauts can reproduce the Earth's atmosphere and gravity on the asteroid.

During the excavation in the rock, the body of a humanoid alien, apparently fossilized, was found in a mortuary on the wall of which a platinum plate weighing 130 kg is fixed.

Ryan, the head of drilling jobs, is thrilled with the payoff he and his men can make. The doctor, who rejects Ryan's advances, is instead interested only in the scientific aspect of the discovery and in the success of the operation.

The unexpected awakening of the alien, which begins to claim victims among the crew, generates panic among the survivors, who organize themselves to be able to eliminate him. The most powerful explosive weapons don't seem to scratch it, but in the end, thanks to common fire extinguishers and the large boring drill, the mission is completed and the Earth saved.

Cast
 Xander Berkeley as Ryan
 Brian Krause as Luke Harrison
 Duane Whitaker as Potter
 Michael Zelniker as Archer
 Caroline Barclay as Dr. Dana Shaw
 Bradford Tatum as Cody Harrison
 Barbara Patrick as Samantha 'Nuke em' Rogers
 Calvin Levels as Banton
 Earl Boen as Michael Isaacs
 Brioni Farrell as Agent Berger
 Dale Dye as General Hurst

Release

Home media
The film was released on DVD by Image Entertainment on August 17, 1999. It was later released by Mill Creek Entertainment on May 10, 2011 as a part of a triple-feature with Phantom of the Opera (1998), and The Fear 2.

Reception

TV Guide awarded the film 2/5 stars, writing, "Although professionally done on every level, this entry in the endless string of ALIEN (1979) knockoffs contains little to set itself apart."

References

External links
 
 
 

1996 films
1996 independent films
1990s American films
1990s science fiction horror films
1990s monster movies
American horror television films
American monster movies
American science fiction horror films
American science fiction television films
Films directed by Gary J. Tunnicliffe
Films set in 2019